The 2004 Sharpie 500 was the 24th stock car race of the 2004 NASCAR Nextel Cup Series season and the 44th iteration of the event. The race was held on Saturday, August 28, 2004, before a crowd of 160,000 in Bristol, Tennessee at Bristol Motor Speedway, a 0.533 miles (0.858 km) permanent oval-shaped racetrack. The race took the scheduled 500 laps to complete. At race's end, Dale Earnhardt Jr. of Dale Earnhardt, Inc. would pull away in the late stages of the race to win his 13th career NASCAR Nextel Cup Series win and his fourth win of the season. To fill out the podium, Ryan Newman of Penske-Jasper Racing and Jimmie Johnson of Hendrick Motorsports would finish second and third, respectively.

Earnhardt Jr. would coin a slogan during a post-race interview used to advertise the Bristol Motor Speedway: "It's Bristol, baby!"

Background 

The Bristol Motor Speedway, formerly known as Bristol International Raceway and Bristol Raceway, is a NASCAR short track venue located in Bristol, Tennessee. Constructed in 1960, it held its first NASCAR race on July 30, 1961. Despite its short length, Bristol is among the most popular tracks on the NASCAR schedule because of its distinct features, which include extraordinarily steep banking, an all concrete surface, two pit roads, and stadium-like seating. It has also been named one of the loudest NASCAR tracks.

Entry list 

*Teague would take over Shelmerdine's seat. As a result, the #92 team withdrew.

Practice

First practice 
The first practice session was held on Friday, August 27, at 11:20 AM EST, and would last for 2 hours.

Second practice 
The second practice session was held on Friday, August 27, at 4:50 PM EST, and would last for 45 minutes.

Third and final practice 
The third and final practice session, sometimes referred to as Happy Hour, was held on Friday, August 27, at 6:10 PM EST, and would last for 45 minutes.

Qualifying 
Qualifying was held on Friday, August 27, at 3:10 PM EST. Each driver would have two laps to set a fastest time; the fastest of the two would count as their official qualifying lap. Positions 1-38 would be decided on time, while positions 39-43 would be based on provisionals. Four spots are awarded by the use of provisionals based on owner's points. The fifth is awarded to a past champion who has not otherwise qualified for the race. If no past champ needs the provisional, the next team in the owner points will be awarded a provisional.

Numerous crashes would occur in the session. First, Tony Ave would spin on his second lap, and while he had made a lap, the lap was not good enough to get Ave into the race. Then, Brendan Gaughan would collide with the wall on his second lap. Finally, Michael Waltrip would spin on his second lap and collide with the turn 1 wall while finishing his lap. While the aforementioned two had crashed, they would both have laps good enough to make it into the race, although with the caveat that they would have to start at the rear for the race.

Five drivers would fail to qualify: Hermie Sadler, Stanton Barrett, Brad Teague, Tony Ave, and Ryan McGlynn.

Full qualifying results

Race results

References 

2004 NASCAR Nextel Cup Series
NASCAR races at Bristol Motor Speedway
August 2004 sports events in the United States
2004 in sports in Tennessee